Jacqueline Hahn (born 21 July 1991) is an Austrian former racing cyclist. She competed in the 2013 UCI women's time trial in Florence. Hahn won national titles in the road race, criterium and cyclo-cross during her career.

Major results
Source: 

2007
 1st Schwazer Raiffeisen
2008
 National Road Championships
1st  Junior time trial
3rd Road race
 2nd  Time trial, UEC European Junior Road Championships
2009
 National Road Championships
1st  Criterium
1st  Junior time trial
3rd Road race
 1st Tour de Berne (junior)
2010
 National Road Championships
1st  Under-23 road race
3rd Road race
2011
 1st  Time trial, National Under-23 Road Championships
 1st Langenlois Road Race
 1st Langenlois Criterium
 9th Overall Gracia–Orlová
2012
 1st  Elite race, National Cyclo-cross Championships
 National Road Championships
1st  Under-23 time trial
3rd Time trial
 9th Memorial Davide Fardelli
2013
 National Road Championships
1st  Criterium
1st Under-23 time trial
 7th Time trial, UEC European Junior Road Championships
2014 
 National Road Championships
1st  Road race
2nd Time trial
 1st GP Osterhas
2015
 2nd Time trial, National Road Championships

References

External links

1991 births
Living people
Austrian female cyclists
Sportspeople from Innsbruck
Cyclists at the 2015 European Games
European Games competitors for Austria
21st-century Austrian women